A 20th-century system of plant taxonomy, the Reveal system (see also the Thorne & Reveal system) of plant classification was drawn up by the American botanist James Reveal (1941-2015). The system was published online in 1997 in ten parts as lecture notes comparing the major systems in use at that time. Subsequently, Reveal became an author with the consensus Angiosperm Phylogeny Group (APG) on the APG II 2003 and APG III 2009 processes. Although this largely supplanted the earlier and competing systems, he collaborated with Robert Thorne on his system (2007), and subsequently continued to develop his own system.

1997 system 
 division Magnoliophyta [= angiosperms]
 class Magnoliopsida
 subclass Magnoliidae
 class Piperopsida
 subclass Piperidae
 subclass Nymphaeidae
 subclass Nelumbonidae
 class Liliopsida [= monocots]
 subclass Triurididae
 subclass Aridae
 subclass Liliidae
 subclass Arecidae
 subclass Commelinidae
 subclass Zingiberidae
 class Ranunculopsida
 subclass Ranunculidae
 class Rosopsida
 subclass Caryophyllidae
 subclass Hamamelididae
 subclass Dilleniidae
 subclass Rosidae
 subclass Cornidae
 subclass Lamiidae
 subclass Asteridae

In more detail:

 division 6. Magnoliophyta
 class 1. Magnoliopsida
 subclass 1. Magnoliidae
 superorder 1. Magnolianae
 order 1. Winterales
 family 1. Winteraceae
 order 2. Canellales
 family 1. Canellaceae
 order 3. Illiciales
 family 1. Illiciaceae
 family 2. Schisandraceae
 order 4. Magnoliales
 family 1. Degeneriaceae
 family 2. Himantandraceae
 family 3. Magnoliaceae
 order 5. Eupomatiales
 family 1. Eupomatiaceae
 order 6. Annonales
 family 1. Annonaceae
 order 7. Myristicales
 family 1. Myristicaceae
 order 8. Austrobaileyales
 family 1. Austrobaileyaceae
 superorder 2. Lauranae
 order 1. Laurales
 family 1. Amborellaceae
 family 2. Trimeniaceae
 family 3. Monimiaceae
 family 4. Gomortegaceae
 family 5. Hernandiaceae
 family 6. Lauraceae
 order 2. Calycanthales
 family 1. Calycanthaceae
 family 2. Idiospermaceae
 order 3. Chloranthales
 family 1. Chloranthaceae
 class 2. Piperopsida
 subclass 1. Piperidae
 superorder 1. Piperanae
 order 1. Piperales
 family 1. Saururaceae
 family 2. Piperaceae
 superorder 2. Lactoridanae
 order 1. Lactoridales
 family 1. Lactoridaceae
 order 2. Aristolochiales
 family 1. Aristolochiaceae
 superorder 3. Rafflesianae
 order 1. Hydnorales
 family 1. Hydnoraceae
 order 2. Rafflesiales
 family 1. Apodanthaceae
 family 2. Mitrastemonaceae
 family 3. Rafflesiaceae
 family 4. Cytinaceae
 superorder 4. Balanophoranae
 order 1. Cynomoriales
 family 1. Cynomoriaceae
 order 2. Balanophorales
 family 1. Mystropetalaceae
 family 2. Dactylanthaceae
 family 3. Lophophytaceae
 family 4. Sarcophytaceae
 family 5. Scybaliaceae
 family 6. Heloseaceae
 family 7. Langsdorffiaceae
 family 8. Balanophoraceae
 subclass 2. Nymphaeidae
 superorder 1. Nymphaeanae
 order 1. Nymphaeales
 family 1. Nymphaeaceae
 family 2. Barclayaceae
 subclass 3. Nelumbonidae
 superorder 1. Nelumbonanae
 order 1. Nelumbonales
 family 1. Nelumbonaceae
 order 2. Hydropeltidales
 family 1. Hydropeltidaceae
 family 2. Cabombaceae
 superorder 2. Ceratophyllanae
 order 1. Ceratophyllales
 family 1. Ceratophyllaceae
 class 3. Liliopsida
 subclass 1. Alismatidae
 superorder 1. Butomanae
 order 1. Butomales
 family 1. Butomaceae
 superorder 2. Alismatanae
 order 1. Alismatales
 family 1. Limnocharitaceae
 family 2. Alismataceae
 order 2. Hydrocharitales
 family 1. Hydrocharitaceae
 order 3. Aponogetonales
 family 1. Aponogetonaceae
 order 4. Najadales
 family 1. Najadaceae
 order 5. Juncaginales
 family 1. Scheuchzeriaceae
 family 2. Juncaginaceae
 order 6. Potamogetonales
 family 1. Potamogetonaceae
 family 2. Ruppiaceae
 family 3. Zannichelliaceae
 family 4. Zosteraceae
 family 5. Posidoniaceae
 family 6. Cymodoceaceae
 subclass 2. Triurididae
 superorder 1. Triuridanae
 order 1. Triuridales
 family 1. Triuridaceae
 subclass 3. Aridae
 superorder 1. Acoranae
 order 1. Acorales
 family 1. Acoraceae
 superorder 2. Aranae
 order 1. Arales
 family 1. Araceae
 superorder 3. Cyclanthanae
 order 1. Cyclanthales
 family 1. Cyclanthaceae
 superorder 4. Pandananae
 order 1. Pandanales
 family 1. Pandanaceae
 subclass 4. Liliidae
 order 1. Lilianae
 order 1. Tofieldiales
 family 1. Tofieldiaceae
 order 2. Dioscoreales
 family 1. Trichopodaceae
 family 2. Stenomeridaceae
 family 3. Avetraceae
 family 4. Dioscoreaceae
 family 5. Stemonaceae
 family 6. Croomiaceae
 family 7. Pentastemonaceae
 family 8. Taccaceae
 order 3. Smilacales
 family 1. Ripogonaceae
 family 2. Smilacaceae
 family 3. Petermanniaceae
 order 4. Nartheciales
 family 1. Nartheciaceae
 order 5. Petrosaviales
 family 1. Petrosaviaceae
 order 6. Melanthiales
 family 1. Chionographidaceae
 family 2. Heloniadaceae
 family 3. Xerophyllaceae
 family 4. Melanthiaceae
 family 5. Japonoliriaceae
 family 6. Campynemataceae
 order 7. Trilliales
 family 1. Trilliaceae
 order 8. Alstroemeriales
 family 1. Alstroemeriaceae
 order 9. Colchicales
 family 1. Burchardiaceae
 family 2. Colchicaceae
 family 3. Tricyrtidaceae
 family 4. Uvulariaceae
 family 5. Scoliopaceae
 family 6. Calochortaceae
 order 10. Liliales
 family 1. Liliaceae
 family 2. Medeolaceae
 order 11. Hypoxidales
 family 1. Hypoxidaceae
 order 12. Orchidales
 family 1. Orchidaceae
 order 13. Tecophilaeales
 family 1. Lanariaceae
 family 2. Ixioliriaceae
 family 3. Walleriaceae
 family 4. Tecophilaeaceae
 family 5. Cyanastraceae
 family 6. Eriospermaceae
 order 14. Iridales
 family 1. Iridaceae
 order 15. Burmanniales
 family 1. Burmanniaceae
 family 2. Corsiaceae
 order 16. Amaryllidales
 family 1. Hyacinthaceae
 family 2. Themidaceae
 family 3. Alliaceae
 family 4. Hesperocallidaceae
 family 5. Amaryllidaceae
 order 17. Asparagales
 family 2. Convallariaceae
 family 3. Ophiopogonaceae
 family 4. Asparagaceae
 order 18. Asteliales
 family 1. Dracaenaceae
 family 2. Ruscaceae
 family 3. Nolinaceae
 family 4. Asteliaceae
 family 6. Geitonoplesiaceae
 family 7. Luzuriagaceae
 family 8. Philesiaceae
 order 19. Hanguanales
 family 1. Hanguanaceae
 order 20. Agavales
 family 1. Dasypogonaceae
 family 2. Calectasiaceae
 family 3. Hemerocallidaceae
 family 4. Blandfordiaceae
 family 5. Xanthorrhoeaceae
 family 6. Agavaceae
 family 7. Anthericaceae
 family 8. Laxmanniaceae
 family 9. Herreriaceae
 family 10. Phormiaceae
 family 11. Johnsoniaceae
 family 12. Doryanthaceae
 family 13. Asphodelaceae
 family 14. Aloaceae
 family 15. Aphyllanthaceae
 family 16. Hostaceae
 subclass 5. Arecidae
 superorder 1. Arecanae
 order 1. Arecales
 family 1. Arecaceae
 subclass 6. Commelinidae
 superorder 1. Bromelianae
 order 1. Bromeliales
 family 1. Bromeliaceae
 order 2. Velloziales
 family 1. Velloziaceae
 superorder 2. Pontederianae
 order 1. Haemodorales
 family 1. Haemodoraceae
 order 2. Philydrales
 family 1. Philydraceae
 order 3. Pontederiales
 family 1. Pontederiaceae
 superorder 3. Commelinanae
 order 1. Xyridales
 family 1. Rapateaceae
 family 2. Xyridaceae
 family 3. Mayacaceae
 order 2. Commelinales
 family 1. Commelinaceae
 order 3. Eriocaulales
 family 1. Eriocaulaceae
 superorder 4. Hydatellanae
 order 1. Hydatellales
 family 1. Hydatellaceae
 superorder 5. Typhanae
 order 1. Typhales
 family 1. Typhaceae
 family 2. Sparganiaceae
 superorder 6. Juncanae
 order 1. Juncales
 family 1. Juncaceae
 family 2. Thurniaceae
 order 2. Cyperales
 family 1. Cyperaceae
 order 3. Flagellariales
 order 4. Restionales
 family 1. Flagellariaceae
 family 2. Joinvilleaceae
 family 3. Restionaceae
 family 4. Anarthriaceae
 family 5. Ecdeiocoleaceae
 family 6. Centrolepidaceae
 order 5. Poales
 family 1. Poaceae
 subclass 7. Zingiberidae
 superorder 1. Zingiberanae
 order 1. Zingiberales
 family 1. Strelitziaceae
 family 2. Heliconiaceae
 family 3. Musaceae
 family 4. Lowiaceae
 family 5. Zingiberaceae
 family 6. Costaceae
 family 7. Cannaceae
 family 8. Marantaceae
 class 4. Ranunculopsida
 subclass 1. Ranunculidae
 superorder 1. Ranunculanae
 order 1. Lardizabalales
 family 1. Lardizabalaceae
 family 2. Sargentodoxaceae
 family 3. Decaisneaceae
 order 2. Menispermales
 family 1. Menispermaceae
 order 3. Berberidales
 family 1. Nandinaceae
 family 2. Berberidaceae
 family 3. Ranzaniaceae
 family 4. Podophyllaceae
 family 5. Leonticaceae
 order 4. Ranunculales
 family 1. Hydrastidaceae
 family 2. Ranunculaceae
 order 5. Circaeasterales
 family 1. Kingdoniaceae
 family 2. Circaeasteraceae
 order 6. Glaucidiales
 family 1. Glaucidiaceae
 order 7. Paeoniales
 family 1. Paeoniaceae
 order 8. Papaverales
 family 1. Pteridophyllaceae
 family 2. Papaveraceae
 class 5. Rosopsida
 subclass 1. Caryophyllidae
 superorder 1. Caryophyllanae
 order 1. Caryophyllales
 family 1. Achatocarpaceae
 family 2. Portulacaceae
 family 3. Hectorellaceae
 family 4. Basellaceae
 family 5. Didiereaceae
 family 6. Cactaceae
 family 7. Stegnospermataceae
 family 8. Phytolaccaceae
 family 9. Petiveriaceae
 family 10. Gisekiaceae
 family 11. Agdestidaceae
 family 12. Barbeuiaceae
 family 13. Nyctaginaceae
 family 14. Sarcobataceae
 family 15. Aizoaceae
 family 16. Sesuviaceae
 family 17. Tetragoniaceae
 family 18. Halophytaceae
 family 19. Molluginaceae
 family 20. Chenopodiaceae
 family 21. Amaranthaceae
 family 22. Caryophyllaceae
 superorder 2. Polygonanae
 order 1. Polygonales
 family 1. Polygonaceae
 superorder 3. Plumbaginanae
 order 1. Plumbaginales
 family 1. Plumbaginaceae
 subclass 2. Hamamelididae
 superorder 1. Trochodendranae
 order 1. Trochodendrales
 family 1. Trochodendraceae
 family 2. Tetracentraceae
 order 2. Eupteleales
 family 1. Eupteleaceae
 order 3. Cercidiphyllales
 family 1. Cercidiphyllaceae
 superorder 2. Myrothamnanae
 order 1. Myrothamnales
 family 1. Myrothamnaceae
 superorder 3. Hamamelidanae
 order 1. Hamamelidales
 family 1. Hamamelidaceae
 family 2. Altingiaceae
 family 3. Platanaceae
 superorder 4. Casuarinanae
 order 1. Casuarinales
 family 1. Casuarinaceae
 superorder 5. Daphniphyllanae
 order 1. Barbeyales
 family 1. Barbeyaceae
 order 2. Daphniphyllales
 family 1. Daphniphyllaceae
 order 3. Balanopales
 family 1. Balanopaceae
 order 4. Didymelales
 family 1. Didymelaceae
 order 5. Buxales
 family 1. Buxaceae
 order 6. Simmondsiales
 family 1. Simmondsiaceae
 superorder 6. Juglandanae
 order 1. Fagales
 family 1. Nothofagaceae
 family 2. Fagaceae
 order 2. Corylales
 family 1. Betulaceae
 family 2. Corylaceae
 family 2. Stylocerataceae
 family 3. Ticodendraceae
 order 3. Myricales
 family 1. Myricaceae
 order 4. Rhoipteleales
 family 1. Rhoipteleaceae
 order 5. Juglandales
 family 1. Juglandaceae
 subclass 3. Dilleniidae
 superorder 1. Dillenianae
 order 1. Dilleniales
 family 1. Dilleniaceae
 superorder 2. Theanae
 order 1. Paracryphiales
 family 1. Paracryphiaceae
 order 2. Theales
 family 1. Stachyuraceae
 family 2. Theaceae
 family 3. Asteropeiaceae
 family 4. Pentaphylacaceae
 family 5. Tetrameristaceae
 family 6. Oncothecaceae
 family 7. Marcgraviaceae
 family 8. Caryocaraceae
 family 9. Pellicieraceae
 family 10. Clusiaceae
 order 3. Physenales
 family 1. Physenaceae
 order 4. Ochnales
 family 1. Medusagynaceae
 family 2. Strasburgeriaceae
 family 3. Scytopetalaceae
 family 4. Ochnaceae
 family 5. Quiinaceae
 order 5. Elatinales
 family 1. Elatinaceae
 order 6. Ancistrocladales
 family 1. Ancistrocladaceae
 order 7. Dioncophyllales
 family 1. Dioncophyllaceae
 superorder 3. Lecythidanae
 order 1. Lecythidales
 family 1. Lecythidaceae
 family 2. Asteranthaceae
 family 3. Napoleonaeaceae
 family 4. Foetidiaceae
 superorder 4. Sarracenianae
 order 1. Sarraceniales
 family 1. Sarraceniaceae
 superorder 5. Nepenthanae
 order 1. Nepenthales
 family 1. Nepenthaceae
 order 2. Droserales
 family 1. Droseraceae
 superorder 6. Ericanae
 order 1. Actinidiales
 family 1. Actinidiaceae
 order 2. Ericales
 family 1. Cyrillaceae
 family 2. Clethraceae
 family 3. Ericaceae
 order 3. Diapensiales
 family 1. Diapensiaceae
 order 4. Bruniales
 family 1. Bruniaceae
 family 2. Grubbiaceae
 order 5. Geissolomatales
 family 1. Geissolomataceae
 order 6. Fouquieriales
 family 1. Fouquieriaceae
 superorder 7. Primulanae
 order 1. Styracales
 family 1. Styracaceae
 family 2. Symplocaceae
 family 3. Ebenaceae
 family 4. Lissocarpaceae
 family 5. Sapotaceae
 order 2. Primulales
 family 1. Theophrastaceae
 family 2. Myrsinaceae
 family 3. Primulaceae
 superorder 8. Violanae
 order 1. Violales
 family 1. Berberidopsidaceae
 family 2. Aphloiaceae
 family 3. Bembiciaceae
 family 4. Flacourtiaceae
 family 5. Lacistemataceae
 family 6. Peridiscaceae
 family 7. Violaceae
 family 8. Dipentodontaceae
 family 9. Scyphostegiaceae
 order 2. Passiflorales
 family 1. Passifloraceae
 family 2. Turneriaceae
 family 3. Malesherbiaceae
 family 4. Achariaceae
 order 3. Caricales
 family 1. Caricaceae
 order 4. Salicales
 family 1. Salicaceae
 order 5. Elaeocarpales
 family 1. Elaeocarpaceae
 order 6. Tamaricales
 family 1. Tamaricaceae
 family 2. Frankeniaceae
 superorder 9. Capparanae
 order 1. Moringales
 family 1. Moringaceae
 order 2. Gyrostemonales
 family 1. Gyrostemonaceae
 order 3. Batales
 family 1. Bataceae
 order 4. Capparales
 family 1. Koeberliniaceae
 family 2. Pentadiplandraceae
 family 3. Capparaceae
 family 4. Brassicaceae
 family 5. Tovariaceae
 family 6. Resedaceae
 superorder 10. Malvanae
 order 1. Cistales
 family 1. Bixaceae
 family 2. Cochlospermaceae
 family 3. Cistaceae
 family 4. Diegodendraceae
 order 2. Malvales
 family 1. Tiliaceae
 family 2. Dirachmaceae
 family 3. Monotaceae
 family 4. Dipterocarpaceae
 family 5. Sarcolaenaceae
 family 6. Plagiopteraceae
 family 7. Huaceae
 family 8. Sterculiaceae
 family 9. Sphaerosepalaceae
 family 10. Bombacaceae
 family 11. Malvaceae
 order 3. Thymelaeales
 family 1. Gonystylaceae
 family 2. Thymelaeaceae
 superorder 11. Cucurbitanae
 order 1. Begoniales
 family 1. Datiscaceae
 family 2. Begoniaceae
 order 2. Cucurbitales
 family 1. Cucurbitaceae
 superorder 12. Urticanae
 order 1. Urticales
 family 1. Ulmaceae
 family 2. Celtidaceae
 family 3. Moraceae
 family 4. Cecropiaceae
 family 5. Urticaceae
 family 6. Cannabaceae
 superorder 13. Euphorbianae
 order 1. Euphorbiales
 family 1. Euphorbiaceae
 family 2. Pandaceae
 family 3. Dichapetalaceae
 subclass 4. Rosidae
 superorder 1. Saxifraganae
 order 1. Cunoniales
 family 1. Cunoniaceae
 family 2. Davidsoniaceae
 family 3. Eucryphiaceae
 family 4. Brunelliaceae
 order 2. Cephalotales
 family 1. Cephalotaceae
 order 3. Greyiales
 family 1. Greyiaceae
 order 4. Francoales
 family 1. Francoaceae
 order 5. Crossosomatales
 family 1. Crossosomataceae
 order 6. Saxifragales
 family 1. Tetracarpaeaceae
 family 2. Penthoraceae
 family 3. Crassulaceae
 family 4. Grossulariaceae
 family 5. Pterostemonaceae
 family 6. Iteaceae
 family 7. Saxifragaceae
 superorder 2. Podostemanae
 order 1. Gunnerales
 family 1. Gunneraceae
 order 2. Haloragales
 family 1. Haloragaceae
 order 3. Podostemales
 family 1. Podostemaceae
 superorder 3. Celastranae
 order 1. Brexiales
 family 1. Brexiaceae
 order 2. Parnassiales
 family 1. Parnassiaceae
 family 2. Lepuropetalaceae
 order 3. Celastrales
 family 1. Celastraceae
 family 2. Goupiaceae
 family 3. Lophopyxidaceae
 family 4. Stackhousiaceae
 order 4. Salvadorales
 family 1. Salvadoraceae
 order 5. Aquifoliales
 family 1. Aquifoliaceae
 family 2. Phellinaceae
 family 3. Sphenostemonaceae
 family 4. Icacinaceae
 family 5. Cardiopteridaceae
 family 6. Aextoxicaceae
 order 6. Corynocarpales
 family 1. Corynocarpaceae
 superorder 4. Santalanae
 order 1. Medusandrales
 family 1. Medusandraceae
 order 2. Santalales
 family 1. Olacaceae
 family 2. Opiliaceae
 family 3. Santalaceae
 family 4. Misodendraceae
 family 5. Loranthaceae
 family 6. Eremolepidaceae
 family 7. Viscaceae
 superorder 5. Rosanae
 order 1. Rosales
 family 1. Rosaceae
 family 2. Neuradaceae
 family 3. Chrysobalanaceae
 superorder 6. Geranianae
 order 1. Geraniales
 family 1. Oxalidaceae
 family 2. Geraniaceae
 order 2. Linales
 family 1. Hugoniaceae
 family 2. Linaceae
 family 3. Ctenolophonaceae
 family 4. Ixonanthaceae
 family 5. Humiriaceae
 family 6. Erythroxylaceae
 family 7. Zygophyllaceae
 order 3. Balsaminales
 family 1. Balsaminaceae
 order 4. Vochysiales
 family 1. Malpighiaceae
 family 2. Trigoniaceae
 family 3. Vochysiaceae
 family 4. Tremandraceae
 family 5. Krameriaceae
 order 5. Polygalales
 family 1. Polygalaceae
 family 2. Xanthophyllaceae
 family 3. Emblingiaceae
 superorder 7. Fabanae
 order 1. Fabales
 family 1. Mimosaceae
 family 2. Caesalpiniaceae
 family 3. Fabaceae
 superorder 8. Rutanae
 order 1. Sapindales
 family 1. Staphyleaceae
 family 2. Tapisciaceae
 family 3. Melianthaceae
 family 4. Sapindaceae
 family 5. Hippocastanaceae
 family 6. Aceraceae
 family 7. Bretschneideraceae
 family 8. Akaniaceae
 order 2. Tropaeolales
 family 1. Tropaeolaceae
 order 3. Limnanthales
 family 1. Limnanthaceae
 order 4. Sabiales
 family 1. Sabiaceae
 order 5. Connarales
 family 1. Connaraceae
 order 6. Rutales
 family 1. Rutaceae
 family 2. Rhabdodendraceae
 family 3. Cneoraceae
 family 4. Simaroubaceae
 family 5. Picramniaceae
 family 6. Leitneriaceae
 family 7. Surianaceae
 family 8. Irvingiaceae
 family 9. Kirkiaceae
 family 10. Ptaeroxylaceae
 family 11. Tepuianthaceae
 family 12. Meliaceae
 family 13. Lepidobotryaceae
 order 7. Coriariales
 family 1. Coriariaceae
 order 8. Burserales
 family 1. Burseraceae
 family 2. Anacardiaceae
 family 3. Podoaceae
 superorder 9. Rhamnanae
 order 1. Rhamnales
 family 1. Rhamnaceae
 order 2. Elaeagnales
 family 1. Elaeagnaceae
 superorder 10. Proteanae
 order 1. Proteales
 family 1. Proteaceae
 superorder 11. Vitanae
 order 1. Vitales
 family 1. Vitaceae
 family 2. Leeaceae
 superorder 12. Rhizophoranae
 order 1. Rhizophorales
 family 1. Anisophylleaceae
 family 2. Rhizophoraceae
 superorder 13. Myrtanae
 order 1. Myrtales
 family 1. Combretaceae
 family 2. Crypteroniaceae
 family 3. Melastomataceae
 family 4. Psiloxylaceae
 family 5. Heteropyxidaceae
 family 6. Myrtaceae
 family 7. Alzateaceae
 family 8. Rhynchocalycaceae
 family 9. Penaeaceae
 family 10. Oliniaceae
 family 11. Lythraceae
 family 12. Trapaceae
 family 13. Onagraceae
 subclass. 5 Cornidae
 superorder 1. Cornanae
 order 1. Hydrangeales
 family 1. Escalloniaceae
 family 2. Hydrangeaceae
 family 3. Abrophyllaceae
 family 4. Argophyllaceae
 family 5. Corokiaceae
 family 6. Alseuosmiaceae
 family 7. Carpodetaceae
 family 8. Phyllonomaceae
 family 9. Pottingeriaceae
 family 10. Tribelaceae
 family 11. Melanophyllaceae
 family 12. Montiniaceae
 family 13. Kaliphoraceae
 family 14. Eremosynaceae
 family 15. Vahliaceae
 family 16. Columelliaceae
 order 2. Roridulales
 family 1. Roridulaceae
 order 3. Garryales
 family 1. Aucubaceae
 family 2. Garryaceae
 order 4. Desfontainiales
 family 1. Desfontainiaceae
 order 5. Aralidiales
 family 1. Aralidiaceae
 order 6. Cornales
 family 1. Mastixiaceae
 family 2. Davidiaceae
 family 3. Nyssaceae
 family 4. Curtisiaceae
 family 5. Cornaceae
 family 6. Alangiaceae
 family 7. Griseliniaceae
 superorder 2. Eucommianae
 order 1. Eucommiales
 family 1. Eucommiaceae
 superorder 3. Aralianae
 order 1. Torricelliales
 family 1. Helwingiaceae
 family 2. Torricelliaceae
 order 2. Pittosporales
 family 1. Pittosporaceae
 order 3. Byblidales
 family 1. Byblidaceae
 order 4. Araliales
 family 1. Araliaceae
 family 2. Hydrocotylaceae
 family 3. Apiaceae
 superorder 4. Dipsacanae
 order 1. Dipsacales
 family 1. Viburnaceae
 family 2. Sambucaceae
 family 3. Adoxaceae
 family 4. Caprifoliaceae
 family 5. Valerianaceae
 family 6. Dipsacaceae
 family 7. Morinaceae
 subclass 6. Lamiidae
 superorder 1. Gentiananae
 order 1. Gentianales
 family 1. Gelsemiaceae
 family 2. Loganiaceae
 family 3. Strychnaceae
 family 4. Gentianaceae
 family 5. Saccifoliaceae
 family 6. Geniostomaceae
 family 7. Plocospermataceae
 order 2. Rubiales
 family 1. Dialypetalanthaceae
 family 2. Rubiaceae
 family 3. Carlemanniaceae
 order 3. Apocynales
 family 1. Apocynaceae
 superorder 2. Solananae
 order 1. Solanales
 family 1. Solanaceae
 family 2. Sclerophylacaceae
 family 3. Goetzeaceae
 family 4. Duckeodendraceae
 family 5. Convolvulaceae
 family 6. Cuscutaceae
 family 7. Polemoniaceae
 family 8. Hydrophyllaceae
 family 9. Boraginaceae
 family 10. Tetrachondraceae
 family 11. Hoplestigmataceae
 family 12. Lennoaceae
 superorder 3. Loasanae
 order 1. Loasales
 family 1. Loasaceae
 superorder 4. Oleanae
 order 1. Oleales
 family 1. Oleaceae
 superorder 5. Lamianae
 order 1. Lamiales
 family 1. Buddlejaceae
 family 2. Stilbaceae
 family 3. Bignoniaceae
 family 4. Paulowniaceae
 family 5. Schlegeliaceae
 family 6. Globulariaceae
 family 7. Scrophulariaceae
 family 8. Veronicaceae
 family 9. Orobanchaceae
 family 10. Oftiaceae
 family 11. Myoporaceae
 family 12. Callitrichaceae
 family 13. Gesneriaceae
 family 14. Plantaginaceae
 family 15. Pedaliaceae
 family 16. Martyniaceae
 family 17. Trapellaceae
 family 18. Acanthaceae
 family 19. Lentibulariaceae
 family 20. Verbenaceae
 family 21. Phrymaceae
 family 22. Cyclocheilaceae
 family 23. Avicenniaceae
 family 24. Lamiaceae
 order 2. Hydrostachyales
 family 1. Hydrostachyaceae
 order 3. Hippuridales
 family 1. Hippuridaceae
 subclass 7. Asteridae
 superorder Campanulanae
 order 1. Menyanthales
 family 1. Menyanthaceae
 order 2. Goodeniales
 family 1. Goodeniaceae
 order 3. Stylidiales
 family 1. Donatiaceae
 family 2. Stylidiaceae
 order 4. Campanulales
 family 1. Pentaphragmataceae
 family 2. Sphenocleaceae
 family 3. Campanulaceae
 superorder 2. Asteranae
 order 1. Calycerales
 family 1. Calyceraceae
 order 2. Asterales
 family 1. Asteraceae

References

Bibliography

External links 
 Plantsystematics.org

system, Reveal